Stilyan Rosenov Grozdev (Bulgarian: Стилиян Росенов Гроздев; born ) is a Bulgarian male weightlifter, most recently competing in the 67 kg division at the 2018 World Weightlifting Championships.

Career
He won the silver medal at the 2018 European Weightlifting Championships in the 62 kg division.

In 2021 he competed at the 2021 European Weightlifting Championships in the 61 kg category, winning the gold in the snatch, the silver medal in the clean & jerk portion and the gold in the total with 296 kg.

Major results

References

External links
 

Living people
1999 births
Bulgarian male weightlifters
European Weightlifting Championships medalists
21st-century Bulgarian people